Elections to the French National Assembly were held in French Sudan on 2 January 1956 as part of the wider French parliamentary elections. Four members were elected, with the Sudanese Progressive Party (PSS) and the Sudanese Union – African Democratic Rally (US–RDA) winning two each. Mamadou Konaté and Modibo Keïta were elected on the US–RDA list, whilst Fily Dabo Sissoko and Hamadoun Dicko were elected for the PSS.

Results

References

1956 in French Sudan
Elections in Mali
French Sudan
French Sudan